Obre Lake/North of Sixty Airport  is a private aerodrome near Obre Lake in the Northwest Territories, Canada. Prior permission is required to land except in the case of an emergency.

See also
 Obre Lake/North of Sixty Water Aerodrome

References

Registered aerodromes in the North Slave Region